All Eyes is a 2022 popcorn horror/comedy film written and directed by the Greenlee brothers and distributed by Gravitas Ventures. It stars Jasper Hammer as a disgraced podcast host who interviews an eccentric farmer (Ben Hall) who claims to have a monster living in the woods near his house.

Plot 
Allen (Jasper Hammer) is a disgraced podcast host who was recently fired. Looking for a story to restart his career, he learns about a widowed farmer (Ben Hall) who lives by the forest and claims there is a monster in the woods. They make a plan to capture and kill the monster.

Cast 

 Jasper Hammer as Allen
 Ben Hall as Don
 Danielle Evon Ploeger As Kim
 Nick Ballard as Mark
 Laura Cummings as Jean
 Skyler Davenport as Alice

Production 
Filmed in Hobart, Oklahoma and Altus, Oklahoma during July 2020. The film was written by Alex Greenlee and directed by Todd Greenlee. Several of the Greenlee family is listed as part of the film crew. The distributor was Gravitas Ventures.

Reception 
Alan Ng of Film Threat gave the film a score of 8.5/10, writing: "Though I found the story about the mutual admiration society between Don and Allen worth watching, the fun of All Eyes is the exciting and thrilling second half about a farmhouse full of booby traps."

Accolades
The film won four awards at various horror film tests across North America out of fifteen nominations.

References

External links 

 
 
 

2022 films